B-Daman Fireblast, known in Japan as , is the second B-Daman anime series in the Crossfire saga, succeeding B-Daman Crossfire, and is based on the Emblem Charge System introduced in the toyline in September 2012. It premiered on October 7, 2012, after an airing of Beyblade: Shogun Steel at 8:45 JST on the TV Tokyo network. It was later moved to 8:30 JST following the conclusion of the Beyblade: Shogun Steel anime, and the introduction of the Beast Saga anime.

B-Daman Fireblast first launched internationally outside Japan in June 2014, in the country of Spain, followed by India, Germany and others. On March 27, 2015, B-Daman Fireblast was released in North America through a new app for iPhone and iPad, with an Android device release on April 13, 2015. The app upon release featured access to the first 9 episodes in English. Originally, the English dub was to be run by The CW's Saturday morning block Vortexx following the run of B-Daman Crossfire, but those plans never came into fruition as the block later ceased operations in September 2014.

Plot

The new anime takes place in "Crest Land", set after the mysterious "B-Crystal" went berserk at the WBMA Headquarters. The main protagonist, Kamon Day, lives in the south area of Crest Land, and is an energetic boy who loves B-Daman. However, he lost his all past memories of B-Daman and his family, except for his big sister Aona who lives with him. One day, Kamon meets Garuburn, a B-Daman, at his local B-Daman shop, "B-Junk", and he finds Garuburn strangely familiar. Garuburn becomes his partner, and he returns to the B-Daman battles once again.

Characters

Main Characters
 / Kamon Day

The Southern B-Master of Crest Land and younger brother of Aona and Roma. His B-Daman is Drive Garuburn.
 / Ken Ogami

A Blacklist B-Shot, having had his qualification to compete in the Road Fight was revoked by Bakuga, and continued participating without authorization. His B-Daman is Detonate Wolg.

His B-Daman is Slot Stinger.
 / Samuru Shigami

His current B-Daman is Sonic Dravise, an upgrade from his previous Lightning Dravise.
 / Yuki Washimura

His current B-Daman is Across=Eagle, an upgrade from his previous Strike Avian.

Supporting Characters
 / Aona Day

Kamon and Roma's older sister.
 / Greg Day

The father of Kamon, Aona, and Roma, and has reinvoled himself in Kamon's life to help him fulfill his destiny with the legendary B-Daman, Drive Garuburn.
 / Himiko Day

The matriarch of the Day family, being the wife of Greg, and the mother of Kamon, Aona, and Roma.

B-Masters
Byakuga Shiranui / Bakuga Shira

The B-Master of the Western Area of Crestland, and the hated arch-rival of Ken Ogami. His B-Daman is Kreis Raydra.
 / Jenta Kokuji

The B-Master of the Northern Area of Crestland who was previously brainwashed by Ryoma until he lost to Kamon. His B-Daman is Dashing Tankshell.
 / Riki Ryugasaki

The Crossfire Champion, having foiled Rudy and Smash=Dragold's planned world conquest with the help of Samuru, Novu, and Basara. He is also the B-Master of the Eastern Area of Crestland. His current B-Daman is Rising=Dracyan, an upgrade from his previous Thunder Dracyan.
 / Ryoma Day

The Grand B-Master of Crestland, and the middle child of the Day family, being Kamon and Aona's older and younger brother respectively. His B-Daman is Triple Gillusion.

Antagonists
 / Genya Kokuji

Known as Agent Dark, he is the one behind Triple=Gillusion's manipulation of Roma Day, the creation of the Road Fight, the hostile takeover of the Shira Corporation, and the development of the deadly Core System weapons. He is also the father of Jenta.

The leader of the Master Guardians, and works under the Western B-Master, Bakuga Shira.

Known as Agent Chaos while she was being controlled by Triple Gillusion, she is Ryoma's assistant.

Recurring Characters
 / Basara Kurochi

A Dragon B-Shot. His current B-Daman is Stream Drazeros, an upgrade from his previous Double Drazeros.
 / Grandpa Takakura

The head of the WBMA and Rory's grandfather.
 / Hugo Raidoh

His current B-Daman is Jet=Leohjya, an upgrade from his previous Thunder Leo.
 / Novu Moru

His current B-Daman is Force Dragren, an upgrade from his previous Strike Dragren.
 / Rory Takakura

The granddaughter of Takakura. Her B-Daman is Steer=Swallow.
 / Simon Sumiya

His current B-Daman is Mach=Sasword, an upgrade from his previous Lightning Scorpio.
 / Sumi Inaba

Her current B-Daman is Lightning Rabbit.

References

External links
 B-Daman Fireblast portal
 TV Tokyo page

2012 anime television series debuts
Animated television series about children
B-Daman
Japanese children's animated action television series
Japanese children's animated adventure television series
TV Tokyo original programming
Shōnen manga
Television shows based on toys
Comics based on toys